La nostra vita is a 2010 French-Italian film directed by Daniele Luchetti, starring Elio Germano. It competed for the Palme d'Or at the 2010 Cannes Film Festival, with Elio Germano sharing the prize for Best Actor with Javier Bardem for his role in the Mexican film Biutiful directed by Alejandro González Iñárritu.

Plot
Claudio (Elio Germano) is a young construction worker who lives a happy life with his pregnant wife Elena (Isabella Ragonese) and their two children in Rome. They manage together their daily difficulties with love and complicity. One day at the construction site, Claudio discovers the corpse of an illegal Romanian worker who died while working intoxicated, but decides not to report the discovery for fear that the site will be closed down. His life is further struck when Elena dies while giving birth to their third son Vasco, right after their vacation. This is the beginning of a new phase for Claudio, who now concentrates on becoming richer, and buying "things" for his three sons in the hopes of making them happier after losing their mom. Claudio blackmails his employer, Porcari, about the dead Romanian worker, demanding his own construction site to supervise in exchange for his silence. Claudio obtains the whole construction business, not only the wall building business.

Claudio obtains 50,000 Euros from his drug-dealing neighbour Ari to start the work. One day, the Romanian's former lover Gabriela (Alina Madalina Berzunteanu) and his son Andrei (Marius Ignat) come looking for the missing man, but Claudio does not tell them about the truth. He befriends Gabriela and has sex with her. He offers Andrei a job, and allows him to stay at his apartment with his family. More and more difficulties, however, put Claudio in dire straits. Claudio soon runs out of money and time. The construction work is behind schedule. Claudio also cannot pay the illegal workers, and they eventually quit and steal equipment from Claudio. Later Claudio tells Andrei the truth about his father and Andrei leaves, in anger. Claudio asks Porcari to give him more time for the construction job, but is rejected.

Claudio eventually turns to his brother, Piero (Raoul Bova) and sister, Loredana (Stefania Montorsi) to borrow more money for the work. He hires more expensive workers and manages to finish the construction work. He is also able to repay his debts. He encourages Piero to show Gabriela his love. Andrei, however, is still angry with Claudio. The film ends with Claudio allowing all of his children to sleep on his bed he once shared with Elena. Previously, he had forbidden his children to play in, which shows he has changed his vision of life and now gives importance to what has real value.

Cast
 Elio Germano as Claudio
 Isabella Ragonese as Elena
 Raoul Bova as Piero
 Stefania Montorsi as Liliana
 Luca Zingaretti as Ari
 Giorgio Colangeli as Porcari
 Alina Madalina Berzunteanu as Gabriela
 Marius Ignat as Andrein
 Awa Ly as Celeste
 Emiliano Campagnola as Vittorio

Production
Cattleya produced the 6.2 million Euro film together with Rai Cinema and French company Babe Films. The project received money from the Italian Culture Ministry, the CNC and Canal+ via pre-sales.

Release
The film premiered in Italy on 21 May 2010. As of 20 June 2010, Box Office Mojo reported that the film had made 3,805,514 dollars (3,075,807 Euro) at the Italian box office.

References

External links
 

2010 films
2010s Italian-language films
2010 comedy films
Films directed by Daniele Luchetti
Films set in Rome
French comedy films
Italian comedy films
2010s French films